Paul Gartler (born 9 March 1997) is an Austrian football player, who plays as a goalkeeper for Rapid Wien.

Club career
He made his Austrian Football First League debut for Kapfenberger SV on 3 March 2017 in a game against Austria Lustenau.

References

External links
 

1997 births
People from Gleisdorf
Living people
Austrian footballers
Austria youth international footballers
Austria under-21 international footballers
Kapfenberger SV players
2. Liga (Austria) players
Association football goalkeepers
Footballers from Styria